The McKee power station is a gas-fired generating plant located at the McKee production station in north Taranaki, New Zealand.  The plant currently comprises two 50 MW gas turbines in open cycle mode and two 1 MW reciprocating engines in cogeneration mode.  It is owned and operated by Nova Energy.

The 100 MW open cycle gas turbine power station was officially opened in March 2013.  This plant comprises two GE LM6000 gas turbines and was constructed at a cost of $100 million.

See also
 McKee field
 Electricity sector in New Zealand
 List of power stations in New Zealand

References

External links
 Nova Energy website

Natural gas-fired power stations in New Zealand
New Plymouth District
Buildings and structures in Taranaki